Francisco de Asís "Francis" Franco y Martínez-Bordiú, 11th Marquis of Villaverde (born 9 December 1954), is a Spanish aristocrat and manager of several business associations.

Besides his real estate businesses, he owns many parking spaces in Madrid.

He is the grandson of Spanish dictator Francisco Franco.

Biography 
Born in 1954 in Madrid, Francisco, is the third of seven children of surgeon Cristóbal Martínez-Bordiú and Carmen Franco, the only child of Spanish dictator Francisco Franco and Carmen Polo. He had two older sisters, María del Carmen and María de la O, and four younger siblings, María del Mar, José Cristóbal, María de Aránzazu and Jaime Felipe.

He earned a licentiate degree in Medicine and Surgery from the Autonomous University of Madrid (UAM), although he has never practised as physician.

Following a hunting trip to Tarragona in 1977, Franco was sentenced to one and a half months in prison and was subject to the removal of his hunting license in 1978. He was again detained in 1979 during a trip to the Montes Universales in possession of a Remington but not convicted of any offence.

He was engaged for a period to Ana García Obregón.

Francisco changed the order of his surnames under orders from his grandfather in order to perpetuate his Franco lineage.

Marriage and children
Francisco Martínez-Bordiú y Franco first married at Altafulla, Tarragona, on 18 December 1981, to María de Suelves y Figueroa (b. Lima, 22 August 1957), daughter of Juan José de Suelves y de Ponsich, 11th Marquess of Tamarit (Barcelona, 3 November 1928 - Madrid, 26 July 2004) and Victoria de Figueroa y Borbón (m. San Sebastián, 11 August 1955), daughter of the 2nd Count of Romanones (paternal grandfather: Álvaro, 1st Conde de Romanones; maternal great-grandfather: Enrique de Borbón, 1st Duke of Seville), and had two children:

 Francisco Franco y de Suelves (b. Madrid, 30 November 1982).
 Juan José Franco y de Suelves (b. Madrid, 29 September 1985).

Francisco Franco y Martínez-Bordiú and María de Suelves y Figueroa divorced in 1992. Upon his father's death in 1998, Francisco Franco y Martínez-Bordiú succeeded him as 11th Marquis of Villaverde. After the 1988 death of his maternal grandmother, Carmen Polo, he succeeded her as the 2nd Lordship of Meirás (together with accompanying dignity Grandee of Spain).

He married again at Móstoles in March 2001, Miriam Guisasola y Carrión (b. 1967), and had two children:

 Alvaro Franco y Guisasola (b. Madrid, 15 August 1994).
 Miriam Franco y Guisasola (b. Madrid, 5 February 1996).

The couple divorced in 2014.

References

External links

1954 births
Francoist Spain
Lords of Spain
Living people
Marquesses of Spain
Grandees of Spain
Francisco Franco
Hunters